Comparative physiology is a subdiscipline of physiology that studies and exploits the diversity of functional characteristics of various kinds of organisms.  It is closely related to evolutionary physiology and environmental physiology.  Many universities offer undergraduate courses that cover comparative aspects of animal physiology. According to Clifford Ladd Prosser, "Comparative Physiology
is not so much a defined discipline as a viewpoint, a philosophy."

History
Originally, as narrated in a recent history of the field, physiology focused primarily on human beings, in large part from a desire to improve medical practices.  When physiologists first began comparing different species it was sometimes out of simple curiosity to understand how organisms work but also stemmed from a desire to discover basic physiological principles.  This use of specific organisms convenient to study specific questions is known as the Krogh Principle.

Methodology
C. Ladd Prosser, a founder of modern comparative physiology, outlined a broad agenda for comparative physiology in his 1950 edited volume (see summary and discussion in Garland and Carter):

1.  To describe how different kinds of animals meet their needs.
This amounts to cataloging functional aspects of biological diversity, and has recently been criticized as "stamp collecting" with the suggestion that the field should move beyond that initial, exploratory phase.

2.  The use of physiological information to reconstruct phylogenetic relationships of organisms.
In principle physiological information could be used just as morphological information or DNA sequence is used to measure evolutionary divergence of organisms.  In practice, this has rarely been done, for at least four reasons:
 physiology doesn't leave many fossil cues,
 it can't be measured on museum specimens,
 it is difficult to quantify as compared with morphology or DNA sequences, and
 physiology is more likely to be adaptive than DNA, and so subject to parallel and convergent evolution, which confuses phylogenetic reconstruction.

3.  To elucidate how physiology mediates interactions between organisms and their environments.
This is essentially physiological ecology or ecological physiology.

4.  To identify "model systems" for studying particular physiological functions.
Examples of this include using squid giant axons to understand general principles of nerve transmission, using rattlesnake tail shaker muscles for measurement of in vivo changes in metabolites (because the whole animal can be put in an NMR machine), and the use of ectothermic poikilotherms to study effects of temperature on physiology.

5.  To use the "kind of animal" as an experimental variable.
 "While other branches of physiology use such variables as light, temperature, oxygen tension, and hormone balance, comparative physiology uses, in addition, species or animal type as a variable for each function."
 25 years later, Prosser put things this way: "I like to think of it as that method in physiology which uses kind of organism as one experimental variable."

Comparative physiologists often study organisms that live in "extreme" environments (e.g., deserts) because they expect to find especially clear examples of evolutionary adaptation.  One example is the study of water balance in desert-inhabiting mammals, which have been found to exhibit kidney specializations.

Similarly, comparative physiologists have been attracted to "unusual" organisms, such as very large or small ones.  As an example, of the latter, hummingbirds have been studied.  As another example, giraffe have been studied because of their long necks and the expectation that this would lead to specializations related to the regulation of blood pressure.  More generally, ectothermic vertebrates have been studied to determine how blood acid-base balance and pH change as body temperature changes.

Funding
In the United States, research in comparative physiology is funded by both the National Institutes of Health and the National Science Foundation.

Societies

A number of scientific societies feature sections on comparative physiology, including:
  American Physiological Society
 Australian & New Zealand Society for Comparative Physiology & Biochemistry
 Canadian Society of Zoologists
 Japanese Society for Comparative Physiology and Biochemistry
 Society for Integrative and Comparative Biology
 Society for Experimental Biology

Biographies
Knut Schmidt-Nielsen (1915–2007) was a major figure in vertebrate comparative physiology, serving on the faculty at Duke University for many years and training a large number of students (obituary).  He also authored several books, including an influential text, all known for their accessible writing style.

Grover C. Stephens  (1925–2003) was a well-known invertebrate comparative physiologist, serving on the faculty of the University of Minnesota until becoming the founding chairman of the Department of Organismic Biology at the University of California at Irvine in 1964.  He was the mentor for numerous graduate students, many of whom have gone on to further build the field (obituary).  He authored several books and in addition to being an accomplished biologist was also an accomplished pianist and philosopher.

Some journals that publish articles in comparative animal physiology 

 American Journal of Physiology - Regulatory, Integrative and Comparative Physiology
 Annual Review of Physiology
 Comparative Biochemistry and Physiology
 Integrative and Comparative Biology
 Journal of Comparative Physiology
 Journal of Experimental Biology
 Physiological and Biochemical Zoology

Further reading 

 Anctil, M. 2022. Animal as machine - The quest to understand how animals work and adapt. McGill-Queen's University Press, Montreal & Kingston, London, Chicago.
 Barrington, E. J. W. 1975. Comparative physiology and the challenge of design. Journal of Experimental Zoology 194:271-286.
 Clark, A. J. 1927. Comparative physiology of the heart. Cambridge University Press, London.
 Dantzler, W. H., ed. 1997. Handbook of physiology. Section 13: comparative physiology. Vol. I. Oxford Univ. Press, New York.
 Dantzler, W. H., ed. 1997. Handbook of physiology. Section 13: comparative physiology. Vol. II. Oxford Univ. Press, New York. viii + 751-1824 pp.
 Feder, M. E., A. F. Bennett, W. W. Burggren, and R. B. Huey, eds. 1987. New directions in ecological physiology. Cambridge Univ. Press, New York. 364 pp.
 Garland, T. Jr., and P. A. Carter. 1994. Evolutionary physiology. Annual Review of Physiology 56:579-621. PDF 
 
 
 Gordon, M. S., G. A. Bartholomew, A. D. Grinnell, C. B. Jorgensen, and F. N. White. 1982. Animal physiology: principles and adaptations. 4th ed. MacMillan, New York. 635 pages.
 Greenberg, M. J., P. W. Hochachka, and C. P. Mangum, eds. 1975. New directions in comparative physiology and biochemistry. Journal of Experimental Zoology 194:1-347.
 Hochachka, P. W., and G. N. Somero. 2002. Biochemical adaptation — mechanism and process in physiological evolution. Oxford University Press. 478 pp.
 Mangum, C. P., and P. W. Hochachka. 1998. New directions in comparative physiology and biochemistry: mechanisms, adaptations, and evolution. Physiological Zoology 71:471-484.
 Moyes, C. D., and P. M. Schulte. 2006. Principles of animal physiology. Pearson Benjamin Cummings, San Francisco. 734 pp.
 Prosser, C. L., ed. 1950. Comparative animal physiology. W. B. Saunders Co., Philadelphia. ix + 888 pp.
 Randall, D., W. Burggren, and K. French. 2002. Eckert animal physiology: mechanisms and adaptations. 5th ed. W. H. Freeman and Co., New York. 736 pp. + glossary, appendices, index.
 
 Schmidt-Nielsen, K. 1972. How animals work. Cambridge University Press, Cambridge.
 Schmidt-Nielsen, K. 1984. Scaling: why is animal size so important? Cambridge University Press, Cambridge. 241 pp.
 Schmidt-Nielsen, K. 1997. Animal physiology: adaptation and environment. 5th ed. Cambridge University Press, Cambridge. ix + 607 pp.
 Schmidt-Nielsen, K. 1998. The camel's nose: memoirs of a curious scientist. 352 pp. The Island Press. Review
 Somero, G. N. 2000. Unity in Diversity: A perspective on the methods, contributions, and future of comparative physiology. Annual Review of Physiology 62:927-937.
 
 
 
 
 Willmer, P., G. Stone, and I. Johnston. 2005. Environmental physiology of animals. Second edition. Blackwell Science, Oxford, U.K. xiii + 754 pp.

See also 

 August Krogh
 Claude Bernard
 Comparative anatomy
 Ecophysiology
 Evolutionary physiology
 Human physiology
 John Speakman
 Knut Schmidt-Nielsen
 Krogh Principle
 Lancelot Hogben
 Peter Hochachka
 Phylogenetic comparative methods
 Physiology
 Raymond B. Huey
 Theodore Garland Jr.

References

Physiology
Comparisons